1st class Active State Councillor of the Russian Federation is the highest federal state civilian service rank of Russia. The following list is a list of all persons who was promoted to this rank during the period 2020–2024:

 Vladimir Medinsky
 Maxim Oreshkin
 Yury Chaika
 Anastasia Bondarenko
 Alexey Semyonov
 Alexander Grebenkin
 Tatyana Matveeva
 Svetlana Andryushchenko
 Alexander Vishnyakov
 Tatyana Vorobieva
 Pavel Livadny
 Vladimir Tokarev
 Vitaly Semikin
 Yevgeny Komar
 Viktor Kuznetsov
 Nadezhda Samoylova
 Vasily Toloko
 Vasily Trestsov
 Igor Barinov
 Daniil Yegorov
 Sergey Levin
 Oleg Ryazantsev
 Andrey Kazakov
 Vladimir Yakushev
 Oleg Salagay
 Oleg Skufinsky
 Natalya Khorova
 Yevgeny Grabchak
 Dmitry Zverev
 Tatyana Ilyushnikova
 Ivan Lebedev
 Igor Shumakov
 Alexander Krasko
 Alexey Krivoruchko
 Dmitry Shugaev
 Igor Maslov
 Nikolay Paruzin
 Mikhail Ivankov
 Yevgeny Kamkin
 Pavel Malkov
 Pavel Pugachev
 Igor Kagramanyan
 Kirill Lysogorsky
 Boris Nakonechny
 Pavel Stepanov
 Natalya Bocharova
 Murad Kerimov
 Alexander Narukavnikov
 Svetlana Radionova
 Alexey Sklyar
 Olga Yarilova
 Andrey Gurovich
 Yury Kokov
 Alexander Valyaev
 Eldar Muslimov
 Yelena Rozhkova
 Natalya Savina
 Olga Chepurina
 Igor Shevchenko
 Andrey Nikolaev
 Alexander Trembitsky
 Olga Lyakina
 Viktor Ageev
 Olga Bobrova
 Vadim Ivanov
 Yevgeny Lisyutin
 Alexander Bugaev
 Alexander Poshivay
 Alexander Ivanov
 Alexey Gruzdev
 Sergey Obryvalin

See also
 State civilian and municipal service ranks in Russian Federation

References

Federal state civilian service ranks in the Russian Federation